The 2013 Ivan Hlinka Memorial Tournament is an under-18 ice hockey tournament held in Břeclav, Czech Republic and Piešťany, Slovakia from August 5–10, 2013. As in the previous three years, the venues are Alcaplast Arena in Břeclav and Easton Arena in Piešťany.

Preliminary round
All times are Central European Summer Time (UTC+2).

Group A

Group B

Final round

Seventh place game

Fifth place game

Semifinals

Bronze medal game

Gold medal game

Final standings

See also
2013 IIHF World U18 Championships
2013 World Junior Championships

References

Ivan Hlinka Memorial Tournament
2013
International ice hockey competitions hosted by Slovakia
International ice hockey competitions hosted by the Czech Republic
Ivan
Ivan